Tomorrow We Fly is a 1943 American short documentary film. It tells the parallel stories of building a plane and training an airman. It was nominated for an Academy Award for Best Documentary Short.

References

External links

1943 films
1943 documentary films
Black-and-white documentary films
1943 short films
American short documentary films
American black-and-white films
American World War II propaganda shorts
Documentary films about aviation
1940s short documentary films
1940s English-language films
1940s American films